Q School 2022 – Event 1 was the first of five qualifying tournaments for the 2022–23 snooker season. It took place from 16 May to 21 May 2022 at the Ponds Forge International Sports Centre in Sheffield, England.

Format 
The event was played in a knockout system with the winner of each section earning a two-year tour card to play on the main tour for the 2022–23 and 2023–24 seasons. All matches were the best-of-seven frames.

Main draw

Section 1 
Round 1

Section 2 
Round 1

Section 3 
Round 1

Section 4 
Round 1

Century breaks 
Total: 30

139, 103  Michael Georgiou
137, 134, 100  Liu Hongyu
136, 133  Steven Hallworth
121  George Pragnell
118  Brandon Sargeant
115  Bai Langning
115  Ross Muir
114, 104, 100  Aaron Hill
113, 113  Liam Pullen
111  Gao Yang
111  Harvey Chandler
111  Patrick Whelan
108  Robert Read
107  Martyn Taylor
106  Leo Fernandez
105  Wang Yuchen
105  Sean Harvey
105  Mark Bell
104  Rory McLeod
103  Billy Castle
101  Daniel Womersley
101  Ben Fortey
100  Cheung Ka Wai

References

Snooker competitions in England
Q School (snooker)
2022 in snooker